Brittany Lehua Kamai is an American astrophysicist and racial justice activist. Kamai is a postdoctoral fellow at the University of California, Santa Cruz and the California Institute of Technology. She was the founder of #ShutDownSTEM, part of the Strike for Black Lives held on June 10, 2020. A native Hawaiian, Kamai grew up in Honolulu and graduated from President Theodore Roosevelt High School and the University of Hawaiʻi at Mānoa. She completed her Master of Arts from Fisk University and her PhD from Vanderbilt University. Kamai is only the second native Hawaiian to earn a doctorate in astrophysics and the third to earn a PhD in physics.

Early life and education
Kamai grew up in Honolulu, Hawaii and graduated from President Theodore Roosevelt High School. She completed her Bachelor's degree in physics from the University of Hawaiʻi at Mānoa, where she played NCAA Division I water polo, and her Master of Arts at Fisk University in 2011. She attended graduate school at the University of Chicago, where she worked at the Fermilab, and was awarded her PhD in 2016 from Vanderbilt University. Kamai's doctoral research focused on using the Fermilab Holometer to search for gravitational waves in the MHz frequency range.

Kamai is only the second native Hawaiian to earn a doctorate in astrophysics and the third to earn a PhD in physics. She was part of the Fisk-Vanderbilt Master's to PhD Bridge Program and completed a postdoctoral research fellowship through the Astrophysics Future Faculty Launch Program and Vanderbilt University.

Career
As of June 2020, Kamai held joint postdoctoral appointments at the University of California, Santa Cruz and the California Institue of Technology. She is a member of the research group at the Laser Interferometer Gravitational-Wave Observatory and her research focuses on gravitational wave instrumentation.

#ShutDownSTEM
A Native Hawaiian, Kamai identifies as a woman of color, and in 2020, in response to the murder of George Floyd, she helped organize #ShutDownSTEM to Strike for Black Lives. The initiative, held on June 10, called for those working in STEM to suspend work for the day, focusing instead on education and initiatives to combat systemic anti-Black racism in the field. The event drew international support from the scientific community.

Honours and awards
 Heising-Simons Fellowship.  jointly appointed at Caltech and University of California, Santa Cruz.
 National Academy of Sciences’ Kavli Frontiers of Science Fellow (2018)
 National Academy of Sciences’ Ford Dissertation Fellowship

References

External links
Official website
The Future of Gravitational Waves with Dr. Brittany Kamai – Space Radio Live!
Kamai on Global Science TV, June 2020

American women astronomers
21st-century American astronomers
Scientists from Hawaii
Black Lives Matter people
Living people
Native Hawaiian people
Year of birth missing (living people)
21st-century American women scientists
21st-century African-American women
21st-century African-American people